Amppipal is a village development committee in Gorkha District in the Gandaki Zone of northern-central Nepal. At the time of the 1991 Nepal census it had a population of 5,124 and had 1060 houses in the town.
The small village Amppipal belongs to this VDC.

References

Populated places in Gorkha District